Bedeva elongata is a species of sea snail, a marine gastropod mollusk, in the family Muricidae, the murex snails or rock snails.

References

External links
 syntype at MNHN, Paris
  Barco, A.; Marshall, B.; Houart, R.; Oliverio, M. (2015), Molecular phylogenetics of Haustrinae and Pagodulinae (Neogastropoda: Muricidae) with a focus on New Zealand species. Journal of Molluscan Studies. 81(4): 476-488.

elongata
Gastropods described in 1880